Numbered Doors is the eighth studio album by the folk singer Lori McKenna, released on September 23, 2014. Rolling Stone named it the 16th best country album of 2014.

Track listing

References 

Lori McKenna albums
2014 albums